Africanews is a pan-African multilingual news network located in Lyon, France previously 
headquartered in Pointe-Noire, Republic of the Congo. The news channel began broadcasting online, and via TV and satellite on 20 April 2016. The newsroom has 30 journalists and around 55 technical staffers.

Broadcast 
Like its sister channel Euronews, Africanews runs news and weather summaries every half-hour.

Languages 
Currently, the programs are broadcast in both English and French - most on-screen graphics and captions are bilingual. The channel plans to expand and accommodate most of the continents' population and plans to roll out Swahili, Arabic, Dutch, Spanish and Portuguese content soon in 2022/2023.

Distribution 

The channel currently is broadcast in 33 sub-Saharan countries and is accessible to 7.3 million homes via satellite and digital terrestrial television networks. Africanews is available in the UK, along with a number of other international news channels, via online video subscription service NewsPlayer+  and alongside Euronews on Freeview channel 271 via the Channelbox free streaming service.

Programmes 
 Good Morning Africa: Weekday news bulletin from 6am to 11am ;
 Daily News: Weekday news bulletin from 11am to 6pm ;
 Prime Edition: Weekday news bulletin from 6pm to 11pm ;
 The Nightshift: Weekday news bulletin from 11pm to 6am ;
 International Weekend: Weekend news bulletin ;
 This is Culture!: Daily looks at culture and entertainment ;
 Sci_Tech: Latest science and technology news ;
 No|Comment: Pictures with no commentaries ;
 Météo Africa / Météo World: Your daily weather forecasts ;
 The Morning Call: Get all the top stories happened overnight or early mornings, broadcast weekday mornings from 6 to 11 (only one first hour is live, others are pre-recorded) ;
 Business Africa: Weekly 8-minute roundup on business news and markets in Africa and worldwide, live Thursday nights at 8:15 (with repeats till 11:15 then Friday lunchtime and weekend) ;
 Football Planet: Weekly 10-minute roundup on football news in Africa and Europe, live Monday nights at 8:15 (with repeats till 11:15 then Tuesday lunchtime) ;
 Focus: In-depth world reports ;
 The Global Conversation: Interview with an Africanews' journalist and an international decision-maker ;
 International Edition: Weekly 10-minute analysis of the week's stories that make the headlines, powered by Euronews ;
 Markets: Currencies, African markets and commodities ;
 Timeout Africa: African events roundup.

See also 
 Euronews

References 

2016 establishments in Africa
Television channels and stations established in 2016
International broadcasters
Multilingual news services
English-language television stations
French-language television stations
24-hour television news channels
Pan-African media companies
Companies of the Republic of the Congo